The Munster GAA Hurling Senior Championship, known simply as the Munster Championship, is an annual inter-county hurling competition organised by the Munster Council of the Gaelic Athletic Association (GAA). It is the highest inter-county hurling competition in the province of Munster, and has been contested every year since the 1888 championship.

The final, usually held on the first Sunday in July, serves as the culmination of a series of games played during May and June, and the results determine which team receives the Mick Mackey Cup. The championship was previously played on a straight knockout basis whereby once a team lost they were eliminated from the championship; however, as of 2018, the championship involved a round-robin system.

The Munster Championship is an integral part of the wider GAA Hurling All-Ireland Senior Championship. The winners of the Munster final, like their counterparts in the Leinster Championship, are rewarded by advancing directly to the semi-final stage of the All-Ireland series of games. The losers of the Munster final enter the All-Ireland series at the quarter-final stage, while the third-placed team advances to the preliminary quarter-finals.

Five teams currently participate in the Munster Championship. Two of the most successful teams in hurling, namely Cork and Tipperary, play their provincial hurling in the Munster Championship. Between them, these teams have won the provincial title on 96 occasions while they have also claimed 58 All-Ireland titles.

The title has been won at least once by all six of the Munster counties, five of which have won the title more than once. The all-time record-holders are Cork, who have won the competition 54 times. Limerick are the current champions and have won it four years in succession. 

Hurling is the more prominent of the two Gaelic games in Munster. As such the Munster Championship is regarded as the most skillful and exciting of all the provincial hurling championships. The Munster final, particularly when played in Semple Stadium in Thurles, is considered one of the biggest and best sporting occasions in Ireland.

History

Development
Following the foundation of the Gaelic Athletic Association in 1884, new rules for Gaelic football and hurling were drawn up and published in the United Irishman newspaper. In 1886, county committees began to be established, with several counties affiliating over the next few years. The GAA ran its inaugural All-Ireland Senior Hurling Championship in 1887. The decision to establish that first championship was influenced by several factors. Firstly, inter-club contests in 1885 and 1886 were wildly popular and began to draw huge crowds. Clubs started to travel across the country to play against each other and these matches generated intense interest as the newspapers began to speculate which teams might be considered the best in the country. Secondly, although the number of clubs was growing, many were slow to affiliate to the Association, leaving it short of money. Establishing a central championship held the prospect of enticing GAA clubs to process their affiliations, just as the establishment of the FA Cup had done much in the 1870s to promote the development of the Football Association in England. The championships were open to all affiliated clubs who would first compete in county-based competitions, to be run by local county committees. The winners of each county championship would then proceed to represent that county in the All-Ireland series. For the first and only time in its history the All-Ireland Championship used an open draw format. Six teams entered the first championship, however, this number increased to nine in 1888. Because of this, and in an effort to reduce travelling costs, the GAA decided to introduce provincial championships in Leinster and Munster.

Beginnings
The inaugural Munster Championship featured Clare, Cork, Limerick, Tipperary and Waterford. Cork and Tipperary contested the first match on Sunday 27 May 1888. Despite losing, Cork advanced to the Munster semi-final as Tipperary champions Clonoulty used players from other clubs to supplement their team. Such a format was not yet allowed. A replay was ordered in Cork but Clonoulty refused to play anywhere in Cork stating a preference for Kilmallock. As a result of their refusal to play they were disqualified. The inaugural Munster final between Cork and Clare was to be played on Wednesday 29 August 1888, however, the provincial showpiece ended in disarray. Clare champions Ogonelloe, who had received a walkover from South Liberties of Limerick in the semi-final, however, this was later disputed. Before the final commenced South Liberties took to the field to play Ogonelloe, with the winners competing in the final later that day. The officials decided then not to play either game. It was then decided to play the final in Cork on Sunday 2 September 1888, however, Clare refused to travel and Cork were awarded the title.

Postponements, disqualifications, objections, withdrawals and walkovers were regular occurrences during the initial years of the championship. Kerry became the sixth and final team to enter the championship in 1889, however, the championship ended without a final once again as Kerry conceded a walkover to Clare.

On Sunday 28 September 1890, the very first Munster final took place. Cork won their first title on the field of play after a 2–00 to 0–01 defeat of Kerry. Since then the championship title has been awarded every year except in 1908 when Tipperary were awarded the title after being granted a walkover by Kerry.

Team changes
In spite of winning the Munster title in 1891, Kerry eventually became a county dominated by Gaelic football. Because of this the inter-county hurling team went into a sharp decline. Kerry's championship appearances were sporadic by the 1950s and the county eventually stopped fielding a team at senior level before regrading to the All-Ireland Junior Hurling Championship. After some successes in the All-Ireland Senior B Hurling Championship, Kerry returned to the Munster Championship after a nineteen-year absence in 1977. A decade later the team made a more permanent return to the championship, however, Kerry only recorded one championship victory from then until their last appearance in the championship in 2004.

Due to a lack of competition in the Connacht Championship, the Galway County Board proposed a regrading to the junior championship in January 1958. This led to a wider debate regarding the structure of the championship. The abolition of the provincial system and the introduction of an open draw was rejected. Galway put forward their own proposal for the creation of a new "province" consisting of Galway, Clare, Laois, Offaly and Westmeath, however, this was also rejected. The possibility of starting the National Hurling League in April in an effort to give Galway some game time before the start of the championship was also discussed. At a meeting of the Munster Council on 10 January 1959 it was decided to invite Galway to participate in all grades of hurling in Munster on a temporary basis. This decision was later ratified at the GAA Congress. Galway played in the Munster Championship from 1959 until 1969, however, during that time they won just one of their twelve championship games.

Team dominance
Since the beginning, the championship has been dominated by Cork and Tipperary. They have won a combined total of 96 of the 135 championship titles. The two teams began their hegemony by winning 18 championship titles between 1890 and 1909 with Cork setting a number of records during this time — becoming the first team to win successive titles in 1893, claiming a first three-in-a-row the following year and setting the all-time record of five successive championships between 1901 and 1905. 

After twenty years, Limerick emerged to break the dominance of the "big two" when they claimed five championship titles between 1910 and 1923. Limerick enjoyed a second golden era by winning a further five championship titles between 1933 and 1940, including four-in-a-row in 1933-1936. After a period of decline, Cork returned to dominate by winning nine championships between 1942 and 1956. Tipperary then emerged with what many people regard as their greatest ever team — between 1958 and 1971, they won nine championships. However, Cork returned to dominate the next two decades, winning thirteen championships between 1972 and 1986, including another 5-in-a-row in 1982-1986. To date, they are the only county to win 5-in-a-row. 

The 1990s saw a more equitable period develop in the championship with every team reaching at least one Munster final and title victories for all but Waterford. Waterford then had arguably their strongest moment thus far, winning four championships from six final appearances between 2002 and 2010. The second decade of the new millennium saw a sharing of titles between the "big three" — Tipperary winning four titles, and Cork and Limerick winning 3 each. Waterford lost all of the 5 finals they contested. 

Limerick are the current champions, having won  the 2022 final against Clare — their 4th title in a row.

Format
Between 1888 and 2017 the Munster Championship was a knockout tournament whereby once a team was defeated they were eliminated from the championship. In the early years the pairings were drawn at random and there was no seeding. Each match was played as a single leg. If a match ended in a draw there was a replay. Drawn replays were settled with extra time; however, if both sides were still level at the end of extra time a second replay took place and so on until a winner was found. Extra-time was eventually adopted in the event of a draw for all championship games except the final.

The dominance of Cork and Tipperary eventually led to both these teams being placed on opposite sides of the championship draw. This was later viewed as a mean of penalising the other teams. While it might be possible to beat one of these teams it was deemed near impossible to beat the two strongest teams in the province in a single championship season. This practice was eventually abolished with a return to the open draw in which three of the five teams automatically qualified for the semi-final stage of the championship. Two other teams played in a lone quarter-final with the winner joining the other three teams at the semi-final stage.

The Munster Championship was an integral part of the All-Ireland Senior Hurling Championship. Between 1888 and 1996 the Munster final winners automatically qualified for either the All-Ireland semi-final or final. The introduction of the "back door" system in 1997 allowed the defeated Munster finalists access to the All-Ireland quarter-final, while the Munster champions received a bye to the All-Ireland semi-final. The "back door" system was replaced in 2002 by the All-Ireland Qualifiers which afforded every defeated team in the Munster Championship the chance of qualifying for the All-Ireland Championship. Between 2005 and 2007 both Munster finalists qualified for the All-Ireland quarter-finals, however, this system was abolished in 2008 with the Munster champions receiving a bye to the All-Ireland semi-final.

Current format

Championship
There are five teams in the Munster Championship. During the course of a season — in 2022, from April to May — each team plays the others once (a single round-robin system) for a total of 10 games. Teams receive two points for a win and one point for a draw. No points are awarded for a loss. Teams are ranked by total points. The top two teams in the group contest the Munster final.

Tie-breakers
In the event of teams finishing on equal points, the tie shall be decided by the following means (in the order specified):
 Where two teams only are involved – the outcome of the meeting of the two teams 
 Score difference – subtracting the total "Scores Against" from the total "Scores For"
 Highest Total "Score For"
 Highest Total "Goals For"
 A Play-Off

Qualification for the All-Ireland Championship
As of the 2018 championship qualification for the All-Ireland Championship has changed due to the abolition of the qualifiers. The Munster champions continue to receive a bye to the All-Ireland semi-final while the defeated Munster finalists enter the All-Ireland quarter-finals. The third-placed team in the group enter the All-Ireland Championship at the preliminary quarter-final stage where they play either the champions or runners-up of the Joe McDonagh Cup.

Promotion and relegation
Since 2018, a system of possible promotion and relegation exists between the Munster Championship and the Joe McDonagh Cup. If the winner of Joe McDonagh Cup is a Munster team, it will enter a promotion/relegation playoff with the bottom team in that year's Munster Senior Hurling Championship, with the winner entering the following years Munster Championship, and the loser returning to the following year's edition of the Joe McDonagh Cup. The mechanism has never been employed as Kerry, the only Munster county not competing in the Munster Senior Hurling Championship, has never won the Joe McDonagh Cup.

Teams

2022 championship
The following five teams participated in the 2022 championship.

Other teams

Venues

History
Munster Championship matches were traditionally played at neutral venues or at a location that was deemed to be halfway between the two participants; however, teams eventually came to home and away agreements depending on the capacity of their stadiums. Teams that previously had agreements prior to the restructuring of the championship were Cork and Tipperary, Limerick and Cork and Limerick and Tipperary. Every second meeting between these teams was played at the home venue of one of them.

Waterford and Clare, in spite of having home stadiums, did not have home and away agreements with the other teams as their stadiums were initially deemed not to be of an adequate size for Munster Championship games. These teams usually played their games at neutral venues.

The introduction of the round robin format in 2018 saw home and away arrangements being agreed by all five teams, with every second meeting between the participating teams being played at the home venue of one of the teams. On 16 March 2018, it was confirmed that Waterford would play their two 'home' clashes at a neutral venue instead of Walsh Park. The ground has a capacity of just 8,000 and was deemed unsuitable. Nowlan Park in Kilkenny was mentioned as a possible venue for the Waterford-Tipperary game, however, the Munster Council cited a regulation whereby a change from a home venue can only be to a neutral venue within the province. In November 2018, the Munster Council once again voted against allowing Waterford to play home games in Nowlan Park. On 28 February 2019, it was confirmed that Waterford would play their two home championship games at Walsh Park after resolving a 'structural issue' which reduced the venue's capacity in 2018.

Attendances
Stadium attendances are a significant source of regular income for the Munster Council and for the teams involved. For the 2017 championship, average attendances were 31,998 with a total aggregate attendance figure of 127,992. For a four-game championship, it was the highest cumulative figure since 2008 (136,868). The 2017 figure represented the highest combined total for a Munster Championship since 2009, when 136,908 fans attended five games, including a semi-final replay between Limerick and Waterford. The change of format for the 2018 championship almost doubled attendances. A combined total of 248,809 attended 11 championship games, seeing a 95% increase on the previous year and a 147% rise on 2016. The highest ever attendance at a Munster Championship game was recorded on 30 July 1961 when a crowd of 62,175 attended the Munster final between Cork and Tipperary. This is the officially-recorded attendance, however, due to spectators storming the gates the attendance could have been as high as 70,000 or more.

Group stage
Fixtures in the five group stage rounds of the championship are played at the home ground of one of the two teams. Each team is guaranteed two home games.

Final
The final has historically been played at either Semple Stadium, Páirc Uí Chaoimh or the Gaelic Grounds. As of the 2018 championship, the final is played at one of these venues as per the home and away agreements between Cork, Limerick and Tipperary. If Clare or Waterford were to reach the Munster final the game would be played at a neutral venue.

Managers

Managers in the Munster Championship are involved in the day-to-day running of the team, including the training, team selection, and sourcing of players from the club championships. Their influence varies from county-to-county and is related to the individual county boards. From 2018, all inter-county head coaches must be Award 2 qualified. The manager is assisted by a team of two or three selectors and an extensive backroom team consisting of various coaches. Prior to the development of the concept of a manager in the 1970s, teams were usually managed by a team of selectors with one member acting as chairman. In this capacity, Paddy Leahy won several Munster Championship titles served as chairman of the Tipperary senior hurling selection committee between 1949 and 1965. Jim "Tough" Barry was trainer for all bar one of Cork's Munster Championship-winning teams between 1926 and 1966.

Trophy and medals

At the end of the Munster final, the winning team is presented with a trophy. The Munster Cup, which is similar in design to the Liam MacCarthy Cup, is held by the winning team until the following year's final. Traditionally, the presentation is made at a special rostrum in the stand where GAA and political dignitaries and special guests view the match.

The cup is decorated with ribbons in the colours of the winning team. During the game the cup actually has both teams' sets of ribbons attached and the runners-up ribbons are removed before the presentation. The winning captain accepts the cup on behalf of his team before giving a short speech. Individual members of the winning team then have an opportunity to come to the rostrum to lift the cup.

The present Munster Cup is the third to be used. The first was used from 1928, when it was donated by the Munster Council, until 1990 when a replica was commissioned due to old age. In 2021, a proposal from the Limerick County Board to have the Munster Cup named in honour of Mick Mackey was approved by the Munster Council. The second trophy was then retired and replaced with a third one. An earlier attempt at renaming the cup had been rejected several years earlier.

In accordance with GAA rules, the Munster Council awards up to twenty-six gold medals to the winners of the Munster final.

Sponsorship
Since 1995, the Munster Championship has been sponsored. The sponsor has usually been able to determine the championship's sponsorship name.

Media coverage
In the early years of coverage Radio Éireann had exclusive radio coverage of championship games. When Telefís Éireann was established on 31 December 1961, the new station was interested in the broadcasting of championship games. The GAA, however, were wary that live television coverage would result in lower attendances at games. Because of this, the association restricted annual coverage of its games to the All-Ireland hurling and football finals, the two All-Ireland football semi-finals and the two Railway Cup finals.

RTÉ broadcast highlights of the Munster final for the first time on 19 July 1970. These highlights programmes continued for the rest of the decade until the development of a dedicated highlights programme called The Sunday Game. The first edition of the programme on 8 July 1979 featured extensive coverage and analysis of the Munster final between Cork and Limerick. The first live broadcast of a Munster final took place on Network 2 on 2 July 1989.

In 2007, it was announced that TV3 had signed a three-year broadcasting deal with the GAA, resulting in senior inter-county championship games not being broadcast exclusively on RTÉ for the first time since 1962. TV3's first live championship broadcast was a semi-final between Limerick and Waterford on 1 June 2008. Following the completion of the initial three-year deal in 2010, the GAA were satisfied to give TV3 an expanded role in Gaelic games broadcasting. TV3 broadcast one of the semi-finals over the next three years, however, RTÉ retained the rights to the other matches, including the final.

Since 2017, Sky Sports and RTÉ have shared live coverage of championship matches. Sky broadcast their first championship match, a semi-final between Clare and Limerick, on 4 June 2017, while RTÉ had live coverage of the other three matches including the final.

Championship upsets
The possibility of unlikely victories in the various rounds of the championship, where lower ranked teams beat higher placed opposition in what is known as a "giant killing", is much anticipated by the public. Such upsets are considered an integral part of the tradition and unpredictable nature of the championship, and the attention gained by giant-killing teams can be as great as that for winners of the championship. Almost every team in the championship has a fondly remembered giant-killing act in its history. It is considered particularly newsworthy when a top championship team suffers an upset defeat.

Waterford 9-3 Tipperary 3-4 (12 July 1959): An incredible game of hurling which saw reigning All-Ireland champions Tipperary trounced by Munster minnows Waterford. Tipperary played against the wind in the opening half, however, after one of the most remarkable halves in the history of hurling, Waterford had recorded 8-2 while holding Tipperary scoreless. Michael O'Hehir, who was commentating on a match in the Connacht Football Championship, announced the half-time score on Radio Éireann but advised listeners to "beware for the scoreline read is most probably a hoax". Tipperary were shell shocked; however, they managed to score 3–4 in the second half.
Limerick 6-7 Tipperary 2-18 (29 July 1973): A day which saw Limerick end a provincial drought which had lasted since 1955. Tipperary looked a sure thing to win the game and looked set to break away into an unbeatable lead, however, Limerick hung in there with a fantastic goal-scoring ability. The game hinged on the very final passage of play. A Limerick shot appeared to have gone wide before it struck a Tipperary defender. In spite of this, Limerick were still awarded a 70-yard free. Richie Bennis stepped up to take it and was told that it would have to make a direct score as it was the final puck of the game. Bennis didn't fail, in spite of some Tipperary fans behind the goal claiming that the sliotar trailed off and went wide.
Kerry 4-13 Waterford 3-13 (23 May 1993): Kerry went into this match with great optimism, in spite of not having won a match in the Munster Championship since 1926. Waterford got off to a great start by scoring a goal inside the first minute; however, Kerry battled for every ball. After the interval Kerry were still in contention; however, Waterford pulled five points clear and an upset looked unlikely. A Christy Walsh goal brought Kerry back into the game and a lucky goal from a long-range free from D. J. Leahy gave Kerry the impetus to drive on and win the game.
Cork 4-16 Tipperary 2-14 (15 July 1990): Tipperary were reigning All-Ireland champions and were expected to build on this success in 1990 by retaining the title but despite a strong early start which gave them a good lead Tipperary lost their way and Cork won well in the end. Mark Foley played the game of his life, scoring 2-7 from play, and helped Cork to an eight-point defeat of the All-Ireland champions.
Clare 2-13 Cork 3-9 (4 June 1995): Regarded as the game that changed Clare hurling forever. Trailing by two points with time almost up, Fergus Tuohy angled a line ball neatly into the Cork square and Ollie Baker flicked the ball to the net for the winning goal. Clare later claimed the Munster title for the first time in 63 years following a 1–17 to 0–11 defeat of reigning champions Limerick.
Limerick 1-13 Clare 0-15 (16 June 1996): Played on the hottest day of the year, Limerick set out to topple the reigning All-Ireland champions on the opening day of their campaign. In a game that had a draw written all over it, Clare acquitted themselves well in energy-sapping conditions.  While the game entered the dying stages Barry Foley leveled for Limerick and it looked like a replay would be required.  The resultant puck-out fell into the hands of Limerick captain Ciarán Carey who took off on a remarkable solo-run. Balancing the sliotar on the end of his hurley, Carey ran 70 metres before sending over the match-winner.
Waterford 2-23 Tipperary 3-12 (30 June 2002):  Another Munster Championship game in which the record books were rewritten under the weight of expectation. Waterford were seeking a first Munster title in 39 years, while Tipperary were the reigning provincial and All-Ireland champions.  A point adrift at the interval, Waterford finished in style scoring 1-6 without reply in the final twenty minutes. Ken McGrath scored seven points from play, in spite of going into the game nursing a shoulder injury.

General statistics

List of Finals

Team progress since 1997
Below is a record of each county's performance since the introduction of the qualifier system to the All-Ireland series in 1997.

Key

See also
 All-Ireland Senior Hurling Championship
 Connacht Senior Hurling Championship
 Leinster Senior Hurling Championship
 Ulster Senior Hurling Championship

References

External links

List of Munster Championship-winning teams

 
Munster GAA inter-county hurling competitions
Senior inter-county hurling competitions